Foulis railway station served the village of Ardullie, Highland, Scotland from 1863 to 1964 on the Inverness and Ross-shire Railway.

History 
The station opened on 23 March 1863 by the Inverness and Aberdeen Junction Railway. It closed to passengers in 1960 and goods traffic in 1964.

The station site, now a private house, can be seen from the level crossing near Ardullie, north of the A9 road.

References

External links 

Disused railway stations in Ross and Cromarty
Former Highland Railway stations
Railway stations in Great Britain opened in 1863
Railway stations in Great Britain closed in 1960
1863 establishments in Scotland
1964 disestablishments in Scotland